Sally Greenaway (born 1984) is a composer and pianist based in Canberra, Australia.

Career
Greenaway trained in jazz at Canberra's Australian National University School of Music and the Royal College of Music in London.

After winning Jazzgroove Mothership Orchestra's National Big Band Composition Competition in 2008, Greenaway's composition was recorded and broadcast on ABC Classic FM. She continued recording with several big bands and released her debut album Dig This: Exploring the Big Band in 2013.

Her second album, Aubade & Nocturne, was released by ABC Classics in 2014. Gramophone likened it to the work of Peter Sculthorpe, Nigel Westlake, and other Australian composers. The Sydney Morning Herald gave it 4/5 stars and noted that while it wasn't thematically cohesive, it was "a rewarding experience".

In 2015 she won the inaugural Merlyn Myer Composing Women's Commission, and was commissioned to create a new work which was performed by the Syzygy Ensemble at its premier in 2016. The work The 7 Great Inventions of the Modern Industrial Age (dramatic music) later won the Canberra Critics Circle Awards and the APRA Art Music ACT Award for Instrumental Work of the Year.

The Melbourne Symphony Orchestra commissioned her work Worlds Within Worlds in 2015. It premiered in Melbourne as a chamber piece before being rearranged for a larger ensemble and performed by the National Capital Orchestra in Canberra.

In 2018 her collaboration with Musica Viva, Da Vinci's Apprentice, toured schools across Australia.

Her next solo album Delights and Dances is due in 2022.

Solo Discography
Dig This: Exploring the Big Band (2013)

Aubade & Nocturne (2014)

7 Great Inventions of the Modern Industrial Age (2018)

Delights and Dances (2022)

Awards

References

External links
Official website
Australian Music Centre profile
IMDB artist profile

1984 births
Living people
21st-century classical composers
21st-century women composers
21st-century classical pianists
Australian women classical composers
Australian film score composers
Australian classical pianists
Women film score composers
Women classical pianists
21st-century women pianists